The Bayer designation Delta Chamaeleontis (δ Cha / δ Chamaeleontis) is shared by two star systems, in the constellation Chamaeleon:
δ¹ Chamaeleontis
δ² Chamaeleontis

Chamaeleontis, Delta
Chamaeleon (constellation)